The canton of Chantilly is an administrative division of the Oise department, northern France. Its borders were modified at the French canton reorganisation which came into effect in March 2015. Its seat is in Chantilly.

It consists of the following communes:
 
Apremont
Boran-sur-Oise
Chantilly
Coye-la-Forêt
Crouy-en-Thelle
Gouvieux
Lamorlaye
Le Mesnil-en-Thelle
Morangles
Saint-Maximin

References

Cantons of Oise